Milan Blaško (21 July 1961 – 26 December 2016) was a Slovak ski mountaineer from Poprad. Together with Miroslav Leitner, Milan Madaj and Peter Svätojánsky, he finished fourth in the relay event of the 2006 World Championship of Ski Mountaineering.

External links 
 MilanBlaško at skimountaineering.org

References 

1961 births
Living people
Slovak male ski mountaineers
People from Kežmarok
Sportspeople from the Prešov Region